The videography of British-Australian singer-songwriter Olivia Newton-John consists of sixty-two music videos, three concert tour videos, four music video collections, two music video compilations, one TV special video and three promotional videos for television programs.

Newton-John first music video was for "Follow Me", a promotional single from her 1975 album Have You Never Been Mellow. She released another four music videos (including two from live performances) before Grease. The singles from Grease had excerpts from the film as music videos, with heavy rotation in television. After Grease, Newton-John image changed from goody-goody "Sandy 1" to spandex-clad "Sandy 2", and she released the successful album Totally Hot, with four new music videos (including one live on tour). It's Olivia first pop studio album, before that, her career was basically focused on country music.

Although initially Olivia didn't want to release it, in 1981 "Physical" came out with a music video for the song. The single was a commercial phenomenon, staying for ten weeks on the top of the Billboard Hot 100. The music video was very controversial and was banned by several broadcasters (MTV originally cut the ending). The following year Newton-John released the ABC television special Let's Get Physical, with the music video for "Physical" and new music videos for the Physical album and the Grease and Xanadu soundtracks. The special was a success and received a home video release with two new music videos added ("Love Make Me Strong" and "Falling"), as Olivia Physical. The video won a Grammy Award for Video of the Year and became an iconic piece of the popular culture. In 1983, another music video collection was released, Twist of Fate. The music videos are from Two of a Kind soundtrack ("Take a Chance" is a duet with John Travolta, who appeared in the music video), starring Newton-John. The music video for "Twist of Fate" was nominated for a Grammy Award for Best Short Form Music Video. The Soul Kiss video was released in 1985 and features five music videos for the songs of the album of the same name.

The last music video collection released by Newton-John, to date, is the musical-style Olivia Down Under. The video premiered in 1988 on HBO and in 1989 on home video, and features various songs from the album The Rumour, plus some unreleased songs. In the video, Olivia travels through Australia, celebrates the country bicentenary and shows more of the Australian culture. In 1998, Newton-John made a comeback to country music with the album Back with a Heart and recorded two music videos: one for the lead single, a re-recording of her 1975 hit "I Honestly Love You", and another for the song "Precious Love", to promote the album on Country Music Television. In 2011, the music video for "Magic" (Peach & Murphy remix) featured the biggest cast ever for an Australian music video, with over 300 people.

Beyond the official releases, there are also several licensed home video releases by small distributors, with unreleased Newton-John material such as concerts, music videos and television specials. Examples of these releases are the DVDs 20th Century Masters: The Best of ONJ, A Million Lights Are Dancing: The Heartstrings Tour, Simply Olivia and Live in Japan 1976.

Music videos

1970s

1980s

1990s

2010s

Promotional music videos

Video albums

Concert tour videos

Music video collections

Music video compilations

TV special videos

See also
 Olivia Newton-John discography

References

Videographies of Australian artists
Videographies of British artists 
Videography